This is a list of 134 species in Campodea, a genus of two-pronged bristletails in the family Campodeidae.

Campodea species

 Campodea alluvialis Sendra g
 Campodea anacua Wygodzinsky, 1944 i c g
 Campodea anae Sendra & Teruel g
 Campodea apennina Ramellini, 1998 g
 Campodea apula Silvestri, 1912 g
 Campodea aristotelis Silvestri, 1912 g
 Campodea arrabidae Wygodzinski, 1944 g
 Campodea augens Silvestri, 1936 g
 Campodea aurunca Ramellini, 1990 g
 Campodea azkarraga Sendra, 2006 g
 Campodea barnardi Silvestri, 1932 g
 Campodea basiliensis Wygodzinsky, 1941 g
 Campodea blandinae Condé, 1948 g
 Campodea boneti Silvestri, 1932 g
 Campodea californiensis Hilton, 1932 i c g
 Campodea campestre Ionescu, 1955 g
 Campodea catalana Denis, 1930 g
 Campodea chardardi Condé, 1947 g
 Campodea chica Wygodzinsky, 1944 i c g
 Campodea chionea Rusek, 1966 g
 Campodea codinai Silvestri, 1932 g
 Campodea colladoi Silvestri, 1932 g
 Campodea coniphora Wygodzinski, 1941 g
 Campodea consobrina Condé & Mathieu, 1958 g
 Campodea correai Wygodzinsky, 1944 i c g
 Campodea corsica Condé, 1947 g
 Campodea cyrnea Condé, 1946 g
 Campodea delamarei Condé & Mathieu, 1958 g
 Campodea denisi Wygodzinsky, 1941 g
 Campodea devoniensis Bagnall, 1918 g
 Campodea donensis Rusek, 1965 g
 Campodea egena Conde, 1951 g
 Campodea emeryi Silvestri, 1912 g
 Campodea epirotica Conde, 1984 g
 Campodea escalerai Silvestri, 1932 i c g
 Campodea essigi Silvestri, 1933 i c g
 Campodea eurekae Hilton, 1932 g
 Campodea folsomi Silvestri, 1911 i c g
 Campodea fragilis Meinert, 1865 i c g
 Campodea franzi Conde, 1954 g
 Campodea frascajensis Condé, 1946 g
 Campodea frenata Silvestri, 1931 g
 Campodea galilaea Wygodzinsky, 1942 g
 Campodea gardneri Bagnall, 1918 g
 Campodea gestroi Silvestri, 1912 g
 Campodea giardi Silvestri, 1912 g
 Campodea goursati Condé, 1950 g
 Campodea grallesiensis Sendra & Conde, 1987 g
 Campodea grassii Silvestri, 1912 g
 Campodea hannahae Allen, 1995 i c g
 Campodea hauseri Conde, 1978 g
 Campodea howardi Silvestri, 1911 i c g
 Campodea insidiator Bareth and Conde, 1958 i c g
 Campodea insulana Condé, 1953 g
 Campodea jolyi Condé, 1948 g
 Campodea kellogi Silvestri, 1912 i c g
 Campodea kerni Hilton, 1932 g
 Campodea kervillei Denis, 1932 g
 Campodea lagardei Wygodzinsky, 1944 i c g
 Campodea lamimani Silvestri, 1933 i c g
 Campodea lankesteri Silvestri, 1912 g
 Campodea leclerci Bareth, 1985 g
 Campodea linsleyi Conde and Thomas, 1957 i c g
 Campodea lubbocki Silvestri, 1912 i c g
 Campodea ludoviciana Conde and Geeraert, 1962 i c g
 Campodea lusitana Wygodzinski, 1944 g
 Campodea machadoi Conde, 1951 g
 Campodea magna Ionescu, 1955 g
 Campodea majorica Conde, 1954 g
 Campodea malpighii Silvestri, 1912 g
 Campodea maya Silvestri, 1933 i c g
 Campodea meinerti Bagnall, 1918 i c g
 Campodea merceti Silvestri, 1932 g
 Campodea michelbacheri Conde and Thomas, 1957 i c g
 Campodea minor Wygodzinski, 1944 g
 Campodea monspessulana Condé, 1953 g
 Campodea montana Ionescu, 1955 g
 Campodea montgomeri Silvestri, 1911 i c g
 Campodea monticola Conde and Thomas, 1957 i c g
 Campodea montis Gardner, 1914 i c g
 Campodea morgani Silvestri, 1911 i c g
 Campodea navasi Silvestri, 1932 g
 Campodea neuherzi Conde, 1996 g
 Campodea neusae Sendra & Moreno, 2006 g
 Campodea oredonensis Condé, 1951 g
 Campodea ottei Allen, 2002 i c g
 Campodea pachychaeta Condé, 1946 g
 Campodea pagesi Condé & Mathieu, 1958 g
 Campodea patrizii Conde, 1953 g
 Campodea pempturochaeta (Silvestri, 1912) i c g
 Campodea pieltaini Silvestri, 1932 g
 Campodea plusiocaheta Silvestri, 1912 g
 Campodea plusiochaeta (Silvestri, 1912) i c g
 Campodea portacoeliensis Sendra & Jimenez, 1986 g
 Campodea posterior Silvestri, 1932 g
 Campodea pretneri Conde, 1974 g
 Campodea procera Condé, 1948 g
 Campodea propinqua Silvestri, 1932 g
 Campodea pseudofragilis Conde, 1984 g
 Campodea pusilla Condé, 1956 g
 Campodea quilisi Silvestri, 1932 g
 Campodea redii Silvestri, 1912 g
 Campodea remyi Denis, 1930 g
 Campodea repentina Conde and Thomas, 1957 i c g
 Campodea rhopalota Denis, 1930 i c g
 Campodea ribauti Silvestri, 1912 g
 Campodea rocasolanoi Silvestri, 1932 g
 Campodea rossi Bareth and Conde, 1958 i c g
 Campodea ruseki Conde, 1966 g
 Campodea sarae Sendra & Teruel g
 Campodea sardiniensis Bareth, 1980 g
 Campodea schultzei Silvestri, 1933 i c g
 Campodea scopigera Conde and Thomas, 1957 i c g
 Campodea sensillifera Condé & Mathieu, 1958 g
 Campodea silvestrii Bagnall, 1918 g
 Campodea silvicola Wygodzinski, 1941 g
 Campodea simulans Bareth and Conde, 1958 i c g
 Campodea simulatrix Wygodzinski, 1941 g
 Campodea spelaea Ionescu, 1955 g
 Campodea sprovierii Silvestri, 1933 g
 Campodea staphylinus Westwood, 1852 i c g
 Campodea subdives Silvestri, 1932 g
 Campodea suensoni Tuxen, 1930 g
 Campodea taunica Marten, 1939 g
 Campodea taurica Silvestri, 1949 g
 Campodea teresiae Conde and Thomas, 1957 i c g
 Campodea tuxeni Wygodzinski, 1941 g
 Campodea usingeri Conde and Thomas, 1957 i c g
 Campodea vagans Wygodzinsky, 1944 i c g
 Campodea vihorlatensis Paclt, 1961 g
 Campodea wallacei Bagnall, 1918 g
 Campodea westwoodi Bagnall, 1918 g
 Campodea wygodzinskii Rusek, 1966 g
 Campodea zuluetai Silvestri, 1932 g

Data sources: i = ITIS, c = Catalogue of Life, g = GBIF, b = Bugguide.net

References

Campodea